Latisipho georgianus is a species of sea snail, a marine gastropod mollusk in the family Buccinidae, the true whelks.

References

External links
  Dall, W. H. (1921). Summary of the marine shellbearing mollusks of the northwest coast of America, from San Diego, California, to the Polar Sea, mostly contained in the collection of the United States National Museum, with illustrations of hitherto unfigured species. Bulletin of the United States National Museum. 112: 1-217, pls 1-22
 Kantor Yu.I. & Sysoev A.V. (2006) Marine and brackish water Gastropoda of Russia and adjacent countries: an illustrated catalogue. Moscow: KMK Scientific Press. 372 pp. + 140 pls

Buccinidae
Gastropods described in 1921